Turkish Bodybuilding, Fitness and Armwrestling Federation (shortly TVGFBF) is the governing body of bodybuilding, physical fitness and arm wrestling in Turkey. It was formed in 1991, and is based in Ankara. It is a member of the World Bodybuilding Federation, World Fitness Federation and World Armwrestling Federation . It organizes Turkish championships for each sport branch, and selects national teams for international competitions. President of the federation is Niyazi Kurt.

History

Bodybuilding 
Developed by Eugen Sandow (1867–1925), and took its current form in the early 1980s, the bodybuilding was pioneered in Turkey by Ahmet Enünlü (born 1948). After many years, it has gradually turned into an individual area since 1982. In 1991, the Turkish Bodybuilding Federation was established.

Fitness 
The fitness sport was incorporated into the Turkish Bodybuilding Federation in 1997. The federation was renamed to Turkish Bodybuilding and Fitness Federation.

Arm wrestling 
Arm wresting became first time  known in Turkey in 1991, when Haydar Gidil won the gold medal in the 70 kg category at the World Armwrestling Championship held in Netanya, Israel. It was officially recognized in 1998, and the first Turkish Championship was held in Yalova that year. Arm wrestling became part of the federation four years later in 2001.

References 

Bodybuilding organizations
Wrestling in Turkey
Arm wrestling organizations by country
Organizations based in Ankara
1991 establishments in Turkey
Sports organizations established in 1991
Bıdy Building, Fitness and Armwrestling